Patricia Goosey O’Connor (born 2 October 1940) is the founder of Fashion Careers College (FCC) in San Diego, California.

Life and career
O’Connor has been an educator since 1963 when she graduated from San Diego State University and began teaching for the San Diego Unified School District. After one year away from her hometown of San Diego, teaching at Berkeley Unified School District, she returned to San Diego in 1965 to continue her career with the San Diego Unified School District. Taking a break from her full-time teaching duties at San Diego Unified, she decided to take a part-time position at Patricia Stevens Modeling School to initiate a new fashion merchandising program offered for the first time at the school. She continued there for nine years as director and instructor of the certificate program in fashion merchandising, before founding her own college in 1979. Fashion Careers College was founded in San Diego in January 1979 in a location in Mission Valley In 1984, FCC moved into its new and present location at 1923 Morena Boulevard in San Diego.

Over the years O'Connor has been involved in all aspects of the fashion industry and has taken an active role in the community. She has served on the Joint Committee to develop a Master Plan for Education-Kindergarten through University for California, on the advisory board California Bureau for Private Postsecondary and Vocational Education, and on the Consumer and Family Studies Division and Vocational Education Board for the San Diego Unified School District. She was on the Board of Directors of Educational Talent Search and Fashion Group International of San Diego, Inc. and was appointed Chair of the Board of Directors of the American Friends of the Zandra Rhodes Museum in London.

O’Connor is the creator of the Annual Golden Hanger Fashion Awards Gala and has served as its chair for the past 23 years. She is also the creator of a new annual event at the Timken Museum of Art called The Art of Fashion which brings talented fashion design students from the college to create interpretations of the costumes in some of the great works of art that are part of the permanent collection at the Museum. In 2009 O'Connor was appointed by the Timken Museum to be a member of the Board of Directors. She also serves as a docent and guest lecturer at the museum.

References

American educators
Living people
1940 births
Fashion merchandising